Pleasant Bay may refer to:

 Pleasant Bay, Cape Cod, Orleans, Massachusetts, United States
 Pleasant Bay, Nova Scotia, Canada
 Pleasant Bay (Maine), United States

See also
 Pleasure Bay, a tributary of the Shrewsbury River in Monmouth County, New Jersey, United States